Zindagi Kitni Haseen Hay (ZKHH) is a 2016 Pakistani romantic drama film directed by Anjum Shahzad, written by Abdul Khaliq Khan while produced by Rafiq Ahmed Choudhary, Fahmeeda Abdul Khaliq, Kamran Siddiqui and Jahanzaib Quadir while under the banner of Geo Films. The film's cast include Pakistani Television stars Sajal Ali and Feroze Khan in lead roles.  It is the third project to feature Sajal Ali opposite Feroze Khan after Blockbuster Drama Serials Chup Raho and Gul e Rana. The film was distributed by Geo Films on Eid ul Adha 2016. The film was the remake of the 1979 American film Kramer vs. Kramer.

Plot 
Zindagi Kitni Haseen Hy (ZKHH) revolves around the story of a young couple Zain and Mahira who have raised a kid and seem to be struggling with the challenges of life since they married at a very young age. Both of them have their own dreams to follow and appear to be quite passionate about what they wish to achieve in life. Zain, wants to become a filmmaker. However, as their dreams affect their relationship, the two part ways at some point and so goes the story.

Zindagi Kitni Haseen Hay is an emotional roller coaster that tackles the themes of love, life, suffering and passion as the two protagonists try to find a way ahead.

Cast 

 Sajal Ali as Mahira Khan
 Feroze Khan as Zain Ahmed
 Nabeel Zuberi as Faraz 
 Adil Fayaz as Mangu Seth
 Shafqat Cheema
 Jibraill Ahmed
 Nayyar Ejaz
 Rashid Farooqui
Alyy Khan

Production 
The Film's production is part of a joint venture between an Australian production company RC Films and Rafiq Ahmed Chaudhary's Kingfisher Films. The film's shooting was done in Karachi and Sydney.

Release 
The film's teaser was released online on 29 June 2016. Whilst the film's theatrical trailer was released on 5 July 2016. The film was released on 13 September 2016 in Pakistan.

Home media
The World Television Premiere was held by Geo Entertainment on 27 June 2017, on the occasion of Eid-ul-Fitar.

Digital media
Zindagi Kitni Haseen Hay is available on Netflix as VOD for streaming.

Music
The film's OST is composed by Soch, Udan Khatola and Sohail Haider.

Box office
The film earned 45 lakh on its opening day in Pakistan. Then at  second and third day the film grossed impressively than first day and collected 90 lakh on second day and same amount on third day. The weekend grossing of film remained 1.82 crore.

Accolades

References

External links
 
 

2016 films
Pakistani romantic drama films
2010s Urdu-language films
2016 romantic drama films
Geo Films films
Pakistani remakes of American films